Schrankia boisea is a species of moth of the family Erebidae first described by Jeremy Daniel Holloway in 1977. It is found on New Caledonia.

References

Moths described in 1977
Hypenodinae